also known by his Chinese style name , was a bureaucrat of Ryukyu Kingdom.

In 1775, Kōchi Ryōtoku and Ie Chōkei was ordered to make the first statutory law in Ryukyuan history by King Shō Boku. The law was completed in 1786. It was called Ryūkyū Karitsu, and was jointly signed by Yonabaru Ryōku, Fukuyama Chōki and Ie Chōkei, all were members of sanshikan. It was officially promulgated and implemented by the king in the same year.

Kōchi was dispatched together with Prince Ginowan Chōyō (also known by Ginowan Chōshō) in 1790 to celebrate Tokugawa Ienari succeeded as shōgun of the Tokugawa shogunate. They sailed back in the next year.

Kōchi served as a member of sanshikan from 1796 to 1798.

References

1798 deaths
Ueekata
Sanshikan
People of the Ryukyu Kingdom
Ryukyuan people
18th-century Ryukyuan people